PEF Private University of Management was a private university in Vienna, Austria. It had been accredited by the Austrian Accreditation Council in June 2002. It concentrated on master's programmes in the areas of social and economic science. In 2007, the university was re-accredited until 2014, but closed for economic reasons in March 2012.

PEF had offered four programs
MBA Intra- and Entrepreneurship
MSc Human Resource Management and Organizational Development
MSc Construction Management
MSc Coaching

External links
 PEF Privatuniversität für Management Wien
 Austrian Accreditation Council
 List of universities in Austria

Universities and colleges in Vienna
Educational institutions established in 2002
Business schools in Austria
2002 establishments in Austria
Defunct universities and colleges